Taking Tea With Stalin is a drama written by playwright Ronald Harwood.

Harwood presented the fascination of European intellectuals with Soviet Union. George Bernard Shaw with Nancy Astor and Waldorf Astor visit Stalin in Moscow.

Drama was filmed by Polish Television in 2001 under the title Herbatka u Stalina.

Characters
Joseph Stalin
George Bernard Shaw
Lady Nancy Astor
Lord Waldorf Astor
Mrs. Krynin
Maksim Litvinov
Genrikh Yagoda
Thomas Harvey
Watson

References

Plays by Ronald Harwood
Plays based on real people
Cultural depictions of Joseph Stalin
Cultural depictions of George Bernard Shaw